Qasam (lit. The Vow ) is a Pakistani movie directed by Syed Noor starring Nadeem, Saleem Sheikh and Iram Hassan. This was the debut film for actor Saleem Sheikh, but it got delayed and film Mohabatt Kay Saudagar was released earlier starring Saleem Sheikh.

Plot
The story was based on a boy's story whose parents split up because of his father's second marriage & his mother took him away from his father.

Cast
 Nadeem
 Saleem Sheikh
 Kaveeta
 Iram Hassan
 Kanwal

References

External links

1993 films
Pakistani drama films
Films directed by Syed Noor
1980s Urdu-language films
Films scored by Amjad Bobby
Urdu-language Pakistani films